Athletics events were contested at the 1961 Summer Universiade in Sofia, Bulgaria.

Medal summary

Men

Women

Medal table

References
World Student Games (Universiade - Men) - GBR Athletics
World Student Games (Universiade - Women) - GBR Athletics

Athletics at the Summer Universiade
Uni
1961 Summer Universiade
International athletics competitions hosted by Bulgaria